National Trust Party may refer to:

 National Trust Party (Malaysia), a centre-left political party in Malaysia
 National Trust Party (Iran), a political party in Iran, also translated as National Confidence Party